Cape Verde made its Paralympic Games début at the 2004 Summer Paralympics in Athens, with two competitors in track and field, and one in powerlifting. The country sent a single athlete (Artimiza Sequeira) to the 2008 Games, to compete in the women's shot put, discus and javelin.

In Rio de Janeiro 2016, sprinter Gracelino Barbosa won Cape Verde's first Paralympic medal, a bronze in the Men's 400m T20.

Cape Verde has never taken part in the Winter Paralympics.

Medal tables

Medals by Summer Games

See also
 Cape Verde at the Olympics

References